The 1992 United States presidential election in Oregon took place on November 3, 1992, as part of the 1992 United States presidential election. Voters chose seven representatives, or electors to the Electoral College, who voted for president and vice president.

Oregon was won by Governor Bill Clinton (D-Arkansas) with 42.48% of the popular vote over incumbent President George H. W. Bush (R-Texas) with 32.53%. Businessman Ross Perot (I-Texas) finished in third, with 24.21% of the popular vote. Clinton ultimately won the national vote, defeating incumbent President Bush.

, this is the last occasion when Curry and Jefferson counties have given a plurality to the Democratic Party nominee. It was also the first election since 1888 when Crook County had not backed the winning candidate, although Bush’s margin was less than 200 votes and was only a plurality. Nevertheless, this would mark the county becoming a Republican bastion. Deschutes County, which was narrowly won by Clinton via plurality, would not vote for a Democrat again until 2020.

Results

Results by county

See also
 United States presidential elections in Oregon
 Presidency of Bill Clinton

Notes

References

Oregon
1992
President